New Cumnock railway station is a railway station serving the town of New Cumnock, East Ayrshire, Scotland.

History 
At one time all goods trains had to stop here for inspection before proceeding. On the bleak section beyond the station the London, Midland and Scottish Railway constructed water troughs to permit longer non-stop passenger express runs to be included in the schedules of the Scottish Division. The station closed in 1965 but was reopened by British Rail in 1991.

Services 
As of 2021, there are 8 trains per day in each direction to Glasgow Central and 6 trains to per day to Carlisle on Monday to Saturdays on a mostly 2 hourly frequency; however it's an uneven frequency meaning there are gaps of up to 3 hours at certain times of the day. One of the Carlisle trains extends through to Newcastle, 2 trains per day only go as far as Dumfries. On Sunday a limited service of just 2 trains per day each way operate to Carlisle and Glasgow.

References

2007 views

Sources

External links

Video and commentary on New Cumnock Railway Station

Railway stations in East Ayrshire
Former Glasgow and South Western Railway stations
Railway stations in Great Britain opened in 1850
Railway stations in Great Britain closed in 1965
Railway stations in Great Britain opened in 1991
Railway stations served by ScotRail
SPT railway stations
Beeching closures in Scotland
1991 establishments in Scotland
Reopened railway stations in Great Britain
1850 establishments in Scotland
New Cumnock